Kao An-kuo is a Taiwanese retired general.

Life 
In December 2014, he attended the China Cross-Strait Military Generals Forum held in Xiamen.

In 2018, he established the "Taiwanese Military Government of the Republic of China", aiming to overthrow the Taiwanese government.

In 2021, Kao reportedly made a YouTube video in which he called the Taiwanese military to overthrow the Democratic Progressive Party (DPP) leadership and surrender to China. The video was widely condemned and sparked calls for him to charged with treason.

References 

1944 births
Living people
Army officers